Poikilocytosis is variation in the shapes of red blood cells. Poikilocytes may be oval, teardrop-shaped, sickle-shaped or irregularly contracted.

Normal red blood cells are round, flattened disks that are thinner in the middle than at the edges. A poikilocyte is an abnormally-shaped red blood cell. Generally, poikilocytosis can refer to an increase in abnormal red blood cells of any shape, where they make up 10% or more of the total population of red blood cells.

Types

Membrane abnormalities
 Acanthocytes or Spur/Spike cells
 Codocytes or Target cells
 Echinocytes and Burr cells
 Elliptocytes and Ovalocytes
 Spherocytes
 Stomatocytes or Mouth cells
 Drepanocytes or Sickle Cells
 Degmacytes or "bite cells"

Trauma
 Dacrocytes or Teardrop Cells
 Keratocytes
 Microspherocytes and Pyropoikilocytes
 Schistocytes
 Semilunar bodies

Diagnosis
Poikilocytosis may be diagnosed with a test called a blood smear. During a blood smear, a medical technologist spreads a thin layer of blood on a microscope slide and stains the blood to help differentiate the cells. The technologist then views the blood under a microscope, where the sizes and shapes of the red blood cells can be seen.

Treatment
In all cases, the treatment of poikilocytosis depends on its cause.  For example, poikilocytosis can be caused by a vitamin deficiency (e.g. vitamin B12, folic acid), in which case the treatment is to replenish the deficient vitamin.  It can be caused by a digestive disease, such as celiac disease, in which case the solution may lie in treating the underlying celiac disease so that nutrients can be properly absorbed.

Etymology
The term derives from poikilos (ποικίλος), which means "varied" in Greek .

See also
 Anisocytosis

References

External links

Red blood cell disorders
Abnormal clinical and laboratory findings for RBCs